The Very Best of the Human League is a DVD by veteran British Synthpop group The Human League, containing most of the band's music videos recorded up to that point, digitally re-mastered. The only music video missing is Filling up with Heaven from 1995 which was excluded due to a licensing fee dispute between Virgin Records and EastWest

The DVD also contains as bonus material 4 notable appearances on UK BBC 1 flagship music program Top of the Pops and two songs from a live set performed on BBC 2 program Later with Jools Holland in 1996.

Also included is an interview of band principals Philip Oakey, Susan Ann Sulley and Joanne Catherall; conducted by Simon Price.

Contents

Main track listing
"Circus of Death" 4:38 
"Empire State Human" 3:17 
"Love Action (I Believe in Love)" 3:50
"Open Your Heart" 3:55 
"Don't You Want Me" 3:57 
"Mirror Man" 3:50 
"(Keep Feeling) Fascination" 3:44
"The Lebanon" 3:43 
"Life On Your Own" 4:04 
"Together In Electric Dreams" 3:52 
"Louise" 4:55 
"Human" 3:47
"I Need Your Loving" 3:43
"Love Is All That Matters" 4:04
"Heart Like A Wheel" 4:29 
"Soundtrack to a Generation" 4:36
"Tell Me When" 4:43
"One Man in My Heart" 4:03
"All I Ever Wanted" 3:54

Bonus 'Top of the Pops' tracks

"The Sound of the Crowd" (originally transmitted - 30 April 1981)
"Love Action (I Believe in Love)" (originally transmitted - 6 August 1981)
"Open Your Heart" (originally transmitted - 8 October 1981)
"Dont You Want Me" (originally transmitted - 24 December 1981)

Bonus 'Later with Jools Holland' tracks

"The Stars are Going Out" (originally transmitted - 25 November 1995)
"The Sound of the Crowd" (originally transmitted - 25 November 1995)

Bonus interview track

Oakey/Sulley/Catherall interview by Simon Price (recorded Sheffield 23 July 2003)

Extras

Virgin Records Discography
Screensaver
Wallpaper

References

External links
Reviews
 http://www.league-online.com/dvd.html

The Human League video albums
2003 video albums
Music video compilation albums
2003 compilation albums